Adolphus Philipse (1665–1750) was a wealthy landowner of Dutch descent in the Province of New York. In 1697 he purchased a large tract of land along the east bank of the Hudson River stretching all the way to the east to the Connecticut border. 
Then known as the "Highland Patent" it became in time referred to as the Philipse Patent.  After his death the Patent was inherited by his nephew, Frederick Philipse II, his only heir-at-law, who became the second Lord of the Manor of Philipsborough in Westchester County.

Early life
Adolphus Philipse was born in 1665, the second son of Frederick Philipse, the first Lord of the Manor of Philipsborough, a Dutch immigrant to North America of Bohemian heritage who had risen to become one of the greatest landholders in the New Netherlands.

Career
In 1697, Philipse purchased a tract of land which ran along the northern Westchester County border, which received Royal sanction as the "Highland Patent", later known as the Philipse Patent. Spanning from the Hudson River to the then Connecticut Colony it encompassed some 250 square miles.

Philipse' elder brother Philip, heir to the manor and title, died in 1699.

Upon Frederick's death in 1702, Adolphus received all the Manor north of Dobb's Ferry, including the present town.  He was also named proprietor of a tract of land on the west bank of the Hudson north of Anthony's Nose and executor of Philip's estate. The balance of the Manor, the hereditary title, and family commercial holdings were bequeathed to his nephew, Frederick Philipse II.

After the bachelor Adolphus' death in 1749 (Smith, others 1750), his Manor holdings and the Highland Patent passed to Frederick II, his only heir-at-law, who became the second Lord of the Manor at Philipsborough.

During the American Revolution the Philipse Patent lands were confiscated by the Provisional New York government's Commissioners of Forfeiture.  Sold afterwards, they became today's Putnam County.

Philipse Patent

In 1697 Philipse purchased a tract of land from Dutch traders Lambert Dortlandt and Jan Sybrandt, who had bought it a few years before from several Wiccopee chiefs. This became known as the Highland Patent, and extended approximately 13 miles along the east shore of the Hudson River, from Annsville Creek to the Fish Kill, and eastward some 20 or so miles to the border of the Colony of Connecticut, including Pollopel Island in the Hudson.

Shortly after purchasing it, Philipse, whose residence was the Philipse Manor Hall near Tarrytown, and who maintained only a bachelor shooting lodge on Lake Mahopac in the Highland Patent, opened the tract to tenant settlers. Thus began a policy that lasted throughout his lifetime and his heirs' so long as they owned the land, to rent rather than sell, a practice which led to stunted growth for two and a half centuries to come.

After Philipse's death in 1750 (Smith, 1749), the Highland Patent was inherited by his nephew, Frederick Philipse II, his only heir-at-law, who became the second Lord of the Manor at Philipsborough in Westchester County.

Family 

Adolphus Philipse was the second son of Frederick Philipse, the first lord of Philipsburg Manor, and Margaret Hardenbroeck. He was a younger brother of Philip Philipse.

See also
 Philipse Patent
 Frederick Philipse
 Frederick Philipse II
 Dutchess County Land Patents
 The Oblong

References

External links
 Putnam's Past
 Boundary Changes of Putnam County

1665 births
1750 deaths
American members of the Dutch Reformed Church
American people of Dutch descent
American slave traders
Interlopers (business)
Members of the New York General Assembly
People of the Province of New York
Adolphus
Speakers of the New York General Assembly
Members of the New York Executive Council